Timothy Peter Michael Colley (born 10 July 1935) was an Australian cricketer. He played three first-class matches for South Australia in 1955/56.

References

External links
 

1935 births
Living people
Australian cricketers
South Australia cricketers
Cricketers from Sydney